The Teufelsbach, formerly the Goldbeke, is a western and orographically left tributary of the Goldbach in the German state of Saxony-Anhalt.

See also
List of rivers of Saxony-Anhalt

References 

Rivers of Saxony-Anhalt
Rivers of Germany